The Last Burial is a 2000 Nigerian classic supernatural film, directed by Lancelot Oduwa Imasuen.

Plot
This movie tells a story of a man who had financial difficulties, as a result of his predicament he was introduced to an occult group by his friends, as result of being introduced he had to make some human sacrifices. For years the man enjoyed good life, then it was time for him to die. When he died his burial created a lot of problem. The film was based on the real life happenings surrounding the death of Ogbuefi Nnamani.

Cast 
 Clem Ohameze as Ogouefi
 Eucharia Anunobi
 Amaechi Muonagor
 Sam Dede

References

2000 films
Nigerian horror films
2000s English-language films
English-language Nigerian films